is a passenger railway station located in the city of Takamatsu, Kagawa Prefecture, Japan. It is operated by JR Shikoku and has the station number "T23".

Lines
The station is served by the JR Shikoku Kōtoku Line and is located 9.5 km from the beginning of the line at Takamatsu.

Layout
Yashima Station consists of a side platform and an island platform serving three tracks. A station building houses a waiting room and a JR ticket window (without a Midori no Madoguchi facility). Access to the island platform is by means of a footbridge. A passing loop runs on the far side of the island platform beyond track 3. A large designated parking area for bikes is provided outside the station.

History
At that time the station was operated by Japanese Government Railways, later becoming Japanese National Railways (JNR). With the privatization of JNR on 1 April 1987, control of the station passed to JR Shikoku.

Surrounding area
 Kotoden-Yashima Station 
 Yashima-ji
Takamatsu Municipal Furutakamatsu Elementary School
Takamatsu Municipal Furutakamatsu Junior High School

See also
List of railway stations in Japan

References

External links

Official home page

External links
Yashima Station (JR Shikoku)

Railway stations in Kagawa Prefecture
Railway stations in Japan opened in 1925
Railway stations in Takamatsu